The 1990 World Series was the championship series of Major League Baseball's (MLB) 1990 season. The 87th edition of the World Series, it was a best-of-seven playoff played between the defending champions and heavily favored American League (AL) champion Oakland Athletics and the National League (NL) champion Cincinnati Reds. The Reds defeated the Athletics in a four-game sweep. It was the fifth four-game sweep by the NL and second by the Reds after they did it in 1976. It is remembered for Billy Hatcher's seven consecutive hits. This also was the second World Series meeting between the two clubs (Oakland won four games to three in 1972). As of 2022, this remains both teams' most recent appearance in the World Series.

Athletics manager Tony La Russa and Reds manager Lou Piniella were old friends and teammates from their Tampa American Legion Post 248 team.

Background

Cincinnati Reds 

The Cincinnati Reds won the National League West division by five games over the Los Angeles Dodgers. They set an NL record by staying in first place in the division for the entire season or "wire-to-wire", which had been done only one other time, by the 1984 Detroit Tigers. The Reds then defeated the Pittsburgh Pirates, four games to two, in the National League Championship Series.

"The Nasty Boys" 
The strength of the Cincinnati Reds bullpen and timely hitting led them to a quick sweep of the AL champions. The Reds' bullpen had three primary members—Norm Charlton, Randy Myers, and Rob Dibble—collectively they were known as the "Nasty Boys", who wouldn't let the A's score against them in nearly nine innings of work. Media talk of a forthcoming A's dynasty led Reds fans to call their own team the "dyNASTY." The Nasty Boys originally referred to five pitchers, with the other two being Tim Layana and Tim Birtsas (though history relates it to the aforementioned three). On his XM show, Dibble still adds these two pitchers into the "Nasty Boys", stating it was a collective bullpen effort.

Oakland Athletics 

The Oakland Athletics won the American League West division by nine games over the Chicago White Sox. They then defeated the Boston Red Sox, four games to none, in the American League Championship Series.

The Athletics were the defending World Series champions, two-time defending American League champions, and heavy favorites against the Reds. The Athletics became the first franchise to appear in three consecutive World Series since the 1976–1978 New York Yankees. Their lineup included three former AL Rookies-of-the-Year: José Canseco (1986), Mark McGwire (1987), and Walt Weiss (1988), and six players who finished in the top twelve for AL MVP. A's outfielder Willie McGee won a batting title that year, but it wasn't the AL batting title. He batted .335 for the NL's St Louis Cardinals (with enough plate appearances to qualify for the NL batting title) before he was traded in late August to Oakland.

Behind starter Dave Stewart and reliever Dennis Eckersley, the Athletics had won 306 games over the prior three seasons.

Summary

Matchups

Game 1 

The schedule called for the seven-game series to be held Tue–Wed, Fri–Sat–Sun, Tue–Wed. Games 5, 6, and 7, however, were not necessary. The change in this instance was necessitated by an early season lockout which had caused the first week of the season to be postponed. In order to make up the postponed games, the regular season was extended by three days, causing the postseason to begin on a Thursday rather than a Tuesday, as had been the practice for many years.

When Oakland Athletics pitcher Dave Stewart entered to pitch Game 1, he had a six-game postseason winning streak going, which ended after four innings of work.

The Reds got out of the gate quickly with a two-run home run (that nearly hit the CBS television studio where anchor Pat O'Brien was sitting in left-center) from Eric Davis in the bottom of the first inning off A's ace Dave Stewart. Billy Hatcher helped out offensively in a big way by starting his streak of seven straight hits in the series after a walk in the first inning. The Reds added to their lead when Barry Larkin drew a leadoff walk in the third and scored on a double by Hatcher, who moved to third on shortstop Mike Gallego's throw to home, then scored on Paul O'Neill's groundout. In the fifth, after a one-out double by Hatcher and an O'Neill walk off of Todd Burns, Davis's RBI single made it 5–0 Reds and after a groundout moved the runners up, Chris Sabo's two-run single capped the game's scoring at 7–0. José Rijo settled in after the early lead with seven shutout innings. Two "Nasty Boys," Rob Dibble and Randy Myers pitched the eighth and ninth innings and Cincinnati cruised to a surprise victory. The following day's headline in The Cincinnati Post captured the city's surprise with the headline, "Davis Stuns Goliath."

Game 2 

First Lady Barbara Bush threw out the ceremonial first pitch. Eventual Cy Young Award winner Bob Welch opposed postseason veteran Danny Jackson in Game 2. Rickey Henderson manufactured a run for the A's in the first by getting a hit, stealing second, getting sacrificed to third by Carney Lansford, and scoring on a groundout by José Canseco. The Reds came right back in the bottom of the first. Barry Larkin and Billy Hatcher hit consecutive opposite field doubles and Hatcher would score on Davis's groundout.

In the third the A's got the lead back. José Canseco hit a rocket into the right-center field stands to tie the game (his only hit of the series). A base hit by Mark McGwire and two walks to Dave Henderson and Willie Randolph followed, knocking the ineffective Jackson out of the game. With the bases loaded, Ron Hassey hit a sac fly off new pitcher Scott Scudder to score McGwire and Mike Gallego singled to center off Scudder to score Dave Henderson to give the A's a 4–2 lead.

The A's, however, would not score any more runs thanks to the relief pitching of Scudder, All-Star game starter Jack Armstrong, and the threesome nicknamed the "Nasty Boys": Rob Dibble, Norm Charlton, and Randy Myers.

The Reds got a run closer at 4–3 on pinch hitter Ron Oester's RBI single that drove in Joe Oliver in the fourth; incidentally, this would be the last plate appearance of Oester's career, all 13 seasons of which were spent in Cincinnati. The Reds tied it in the eighth when Hatcher tripled over the crippled Canseco (who was suffering from back spasms throughout the playoffs) and scored on pinch-hitter Glenn Braggs's force play (after O'Neill was walked to set it up). Welch would be charged with all four runs in  innings and Rick Honeycutt was charged with a blown save after allowing Hatcher to score.

During Game 2, Reds pitcher Tom Browning's pregnant wife Debbie went into labor during the game. Debbie left her seat in the fifth inning to drive herself to the hospital. As the game went on, the Reds wanted Browning ready to pitch just in case the game went well into extra innings. Thinking that Browning was en route to a nearby hospital, the Reds had their radio broadcaster Marty Brennaman put out an All Points Bulletin on Browning, a bulletin that was picked up by Tim McCarver on CBS television, who passed it along in the tenth inning.

In the tenth, the Reds broke through to win the game off A's closer Dennis Eckersley. Utilityman Billy Bates chopped an infield single off home plate to start the inning. Chris Sabo singled to left to put runners on first and second. Then Oliver hit a bouncer that hopped over third base and down the line in left to drive in Bates with a walk-off hit.

This was the last of five World Series to be played at Riverfront Stadium (and 1990), which was closed and demolished in 2002. , Great American Ball Park, the Reds current home field, has yet to host a World Series.

Game 3 

In Game 3 the Reds took a 3–0 series lead on the defending champs. Tom Browning (two days after becoming a father) started for the Reds while Mike Moore, who had two wins in the 1989 World Series (alongside Dave Stewart), got the assignment for Oakland despite struggling throughout the regular season. In the second inning, Chris Sabo put the Reds up 1–0 with a solo homer. The lead was short lived as DH Harold Baines hit a soaring two-run homer after a Dave Henderson double to give the A's a 2–1 lead in the bottom of the second.

In the third, the Reds' seven-run inning began with Billy Hatcher's eighth hit in nine at-bats (he had rapped into a double-play in the first inning ending his streak of seven straight hits). Paul O'Neill then singled off the glove of first baseman Mark McGwire to put runners on first and second. Eric Davis drilled a sharp single to center scoring Hatcher to tie the game and advancing O'Neill to third. Following an RBI groundout by Hal Morris that put the Reds ahead, the Reds went up 5–2 when Sabo hit his second homer of the game into the left field stands. Todd Benzinger, the Reds' DH (the game was in an American League Stadium) then singled and Joe Oliver hit an RBI double. Mariano Duncan drove Oliver home with a single, stole second, and scored himself when Barry Larkin hit a gapper. The A's now trailed the Reds 8–2. Rickey Henderson's third inning home run made it 8–3, but Tom Browning pitched effectively for six innings to earn the victory. Dibble and Myers provided three scoreless innings in relief to put the Reds one win away from the title.

Game 4 

The first pitch was thrown out by former Oakland A Joe Rudi. who was a member of the 3 straight championshipships won in 1972, 1973 and 1974. Game 4 was a pitchers' duel between Dave Stewart and José Rijo (the Game 1 starters) that eventually culminated in the Reds sweeping the series. Despite a 3–0 series lead, the Reds' advantage became tenuous early on when two cornerstones of their lineup--Davis and Hatcher--had to be removed from the game with injuries. Hatcher was hit on the hand by a pitch in the first inning. He was taken to the hospital for X-rays but was found to have only a severe bruise and would likely have been day-to-day had the series continued. Davis's injury was more serious and would have been series-ending. Chasing a fly ball, he fell hard on his elbow jammed into his side and sustained both a rib cage injury and a kidney laceration. He was also taken to the hospital and, unlike Hatcher, never returned to the park that night. (He remained hospitalised in Oakland for another week, leading to a public relations debacle when Reds owner Marge Schott made him charter a medically equipped flight back to Cincinnati at his own expense.) The A's got on the board in the first, when Willie McGee doubled and Carney Lansford singled him in. The game remained 1–0 until the eighth, when the Reds finally got to Stewart. Barry Larkin singled up the middle, Herm Winningham followed with a bunt that he beat out for a base hit, and Paul O'Neill reached on a throwing error by Stewart to load the bases. Glenn Braggs' groundout and Hal Morris's sacrifice fly gave the Reds a 2–1 edge, which was preserved by both Rijo, who at one point retired 20 straight batters, and Randy Myers who got the final two outs. The A's became the first team ever to be swept in a World Series after sweeping the League Championship Series. This was later duplicated by the 2007 Colorado Rockies and the 2012 Detroit Tigers.

Cincinnati Reds' pitcher José Rijo became the second Dominican born player to earn World Series MVP honors. Fourteen years after Rijo's award,, Manny Ramírez of the Boston Red Sox became the third.
Other Series heroes included Reds third baseman Chris Sabo who went 9 of 16 (.562) with 2 home runs; and Reds outfielder Billy Hatcher, who set a World Series record with seven consecutive hits. In addition, Hatcher's .750 batting average (9 for 12) broke a four-game-Series mark set by Babe Ruth (.625 in ). Both Sabo and Hatcher were strong candidates to be named the Most Valuable Player.

Composite box 
1990 World Series (4–0): Cincinnati Reds (N.L.) over Oakland Athletics (A.L.)

Radio and television coverage 
This was the first of four consecutive World Series to be televised on CBS. From 1976 to 1989, World Series telecasts alternated between ABC (in odd numbered years) and NBC (in even numbered years). Also during the 1990 World Series, Lesley Visser became the first female sportscaster to cover a World Series. Serving as field reporters for CBS were Jim Kaat (the Reds' dugout) and the aforementioned Visser (the Athletics' dugout).

CBS Radio continued as the radio home of the World Series for a 15th consecutive season. 1990 saw the return of Vin Scully to their radio booth for the first time in eight years; he had left CBS in 1983 after the network chose not to give him their top National Football League assignment alongside John Madden and had spent the previous seven seasons as the lead voice for NBC's baseball telecasts. Johnny Bench, who had joined the radio broadcast in 1989 after Bill White became President of the National League, was the analyst in the booth.

Aftermath 
The 1990 World Series would be the Reds' fifth championship but would also be remembered as one of the biggest upsets in baseball history. The twelve game differential between the teams' regular season records made this one of only two times in World Series history that a team swept an opponent whose regular season record bested theirs by ten games or more, the other being the 1954 New York Giants, who swept the 14-games-better Cleveland Indians. The Reds 22-8 scoring margin was the same scoring margin from their last World Series win in 1976 over the Yankees which also was a sweep. 

The Oakland Athletics were initially favored to win a fourth consecutive American League pennant in 1991, but their pitching that had led the American League by a wide margin in 1990 failed the team in 1991. Staff ace Dave Stewart, whose 1991 ERA (5.18) was more than twice his 1990 ERA (2.56). 1990 Cy Young Award winner Bob Welch fared almost as poorly; his earned run average swelled from 2.95 (1990) to 4.58 (1991). In 1990, he had won a league-high 27 games; in 1991, he won a mere 12. The A's team ERA of 4.57 was the 2nd worst in the American League. On a positive note, Rickey Henderson stole his 938th career base on May 1; in doing so, he succeeded Lou Brock as MLB's career stolen base leader.

Oakland would return to contention in 1992 with a record of 96-66. The 1991 season still, however, marked the end of the Athletics as a dynastic power. The 1992 team failed to dominate the league in the manner that the 1988–90 teams had; following that team's six-game ALCS defeat to the Toronto Blue Jays, Oakland wouldn't reach the postseason until 2000.

As it turned out, the Nasty Boys bullpen trio of Norm Charlton, Rob Dibble and Randy Myers would only play together for two seasons. Myers left after the 1991 season. Charlton, having played for the team since 1988, left after the 1992 season. Dibble, also a Red since 1988, left the following year in 1993. As such, none of the players were present for the next postseason appearance for the Reds, which was in 1995.

This was the last championship of the four major North American sports leagues won by a team from Ohio until the Cleveland Cavaliers made and won the 2016 NBA Finals. This is also the most recent sports championship for the city of Cincinnati. 

To date, this is the last time either team has appeared in the World Series. This was also the final World Series to feature a team that wore pull over jerseys (Cincinnati).

See also
1990 Japan Series

References

External links 

 The Big Sweep at SI.com
 1990 Cincinnati Reds at baseballlibrary.com
 1990 Oakland Athletics at baseballlibrary.com
 Reds History

World Series
World Series
Cincinnati Reds postseason
Oakland Athletics postseason
World Series
World Series
1990s in Cincinnati
20th century in Oakland, California
October 1990 sports events in the United States
Baseball competitions in Cincinnati
Baseball competitions in Oakland, California